Modra nad Cirochou is a village and municipality in Humenné District in the Prešov Region of north-east Slovakia.

History
In historical records the village was first mentioned in 1451.

Geography
The municipality lies at an altitude of 210 metres and covers an area of 7.345 km².
It has a population of about 1030 people.

References

External links
 
 http://www.statistics.sk/mosmis/eng/run.html

Villages and municipalities in Humenné District